Mathra (like Muttra, a corruption of Mathura, the original name) is a village 40 km from Peshawar in Khyber Pakhtunkhwa province of Pakistan. It was formerly also known as Mathra Kona.

Administrative area 
Patwar circles of Mathra Qanungo Halqa is part of Pakistan National Assembly seat NA-2 (Peshawar-2) while Mathra Qanungo Halqa, excluding the patwar circles of Regi Uftazai and Regi Lalma, is part of NA-3 (Peshawar-3) For the KP Provincial Assembly, the entirety of Mathra Qanungo Halqa comes in PF-7 (Peshawar-7).

History 

In April 1926, one of the most famous policemen in India, Eric Handyside, Commandant, North West Frontier Police, was killed in action in Mathra during a routine operation to arrest two outlaws.

Educational Institutes 
 Government Degree College Mathra Peshawar
 Government Girls Degree College Mathra Peshawar

See also 
 Peshawar
 Peshawar District

References

Populated places in Peshawar District